Paul McNally may refer to:

 Paul McNally (astronomer) (1890–1955), American astronomer and Jesuit priest
 Paul McNally (footballer) (born 1949), English footballer